Paul Kinnaird (born 11 November 1966) is a Scottish former footballer. He is now a fitness coach and has worked with Ayr United.

His previous clubs include Norwich City, Dundee United, Motherwell, St Mirren and Partick Thistle, before briefly visiting England to play four times for Shrewsbury Town. A return to his homeland saw him play for St Johnstone, then move to Northern Ireland to play for Derry City in the League of Ireland. He made his League of Ireland debut on 17 October 1993 and scored 2 goals in 20 league appearances for Derry.

He then had brief spells with Dunfermline and Scarborough in 1995. He moved to Ayr United, who released him in May 1997. After a short spell in Iceland with Leiftur, Paul resurrected his career with Stranraer, scoring regularly in the Scottish First Division. In March 1999, he dropped two divisions to join Ross County. However, he faced his former colleagues at Stranraer next season as Ross gained promotion from the Third Division whilst Stranraer were relegated into Division Two.

Freed by Ross in the summer of 2000, Paul was linked with a transfer to Partick Thistle in September 2000 but instead joined Queen of the South in November 2000. Kinnaird moved to Brechin City in March 2001. Released at the end of the season, Paul contacted Partick to see if he could train with them and impressing their assistant manager, was set to join them for the fourth time. He later moved on to Clydebank and then to junior football sides Irvine Meadow and Muirkirk Juniors. In January 2003, he nearly joined Linlithgow Rose but the transfer fell through.

References

External links

Ex-Canaries profile

1966 births
Ayr United F.C. players
Brechin City F.C. players
Clydebank F.C. (1965) players
Derry City F.C. players
Dundee United F.C. players
Dunfermline Athletic F.C. players
Expatriate footballers in Iceland
Association football midfielders
League of Ireland players
Scottish Junior Football Association players
Living people
Motherwell F.C. players
Norwich City F.C. players
Partick Thistle F.C. players
Footballers from Glasgow
Queen of the South F.C. players
Ross County F.C. players
Scarborough F.C. players
Scottish expatriate footballers
Scottish Football League players
Scottish footballers
Shrewsbury Town F.C. players
St Johnstone F.C. players
St Mirren F.C. players
Stranraer F.C. players
English Football League players
Scottish expatriate sportspeople in Iceland
Irvine Meadow XI F.C. players
Muirkirk Juniors F.C. players
Paul Kinnaird
Scotland youth international footballers